Furniture is the mass noun for the movable objects intended to support various human activities such as seating and sleeping.

Furniture may also refer to:

Furniture (band), a British new wave band
Furniture (EP), an EP by Fugazi
"Furniture" (song), a song by Amy Studt
Furniture (typesetting)
The stock, including shoulder butt and handgrips, of a firearm
Horse furniture, equipment or accessories equipped on horses and other equines
Book furniture, straps and clasps used in bookbinding